The Mount Olive Missionary Baptist Church is a historic site in Nassauville, Florida. It is located on County Road 107. On August 28, 1998, it was added to the U.S. National Register of Historic Places.

References

External links
 Nassau County listings at National Register of Historic Places
 Mount Olive Missionary Baptist Church at Florida's Office of Cultural and Historical Programs
 Church begins new life (Florida Times-Union - Wednesday, July 24, 2002)

Buildings and structures in Nassau County, Florida
Churches on the National Register of Historic Places in Florida
National Register of Historic Places in Nassau County, Florida